RioSul Shopping is a commercial center located in the Torre da Marinha area, Seixal, Portugal. It was first opened in 2006 and was constructed by the company Sonae Sierra. RioSul contains 140 shops, 18 restaurants and a cinema.

References

Buildings and structures in Seixal
Shopping centers in Portugal